Nepal A.P.F. Club, commonly known as APF Club, is a sports club based in Kathmandu, Bagmati Province, Nepal. The club is the sports-wing of the Armed Police Force.

History 
The APF Club was established on 24 October 2001, following the tradition of forming a sports club within an official group, as the Police and army had already done. Initially, the club was named Gyanendra APF Club, in tribute to the King at the time.

Later, the government made the decision to remove all references to royalty from the names of government clubs, so the team changed their name to APF Club.

Cricket 
APF is one of the three departmental teams to play in National League Cricket and in Prime Minister One Day Cup. Other nine regional teams along with Nepal Army Club compete with APF in the league. APF formed a cricket team in September 2010. APF initially signed national team captain Paras Khadka and 15 other players while former national team player Raju Basnyat was appointed as the coach. APF is two times champion in one-day format of the league as in 2011 and 2012. In 2012 tournament the APF Cricket Team defended its title defeating Region-4 Bhairawa by six wicket in Final match held on 21 December 2012. In 2012, APF won the Twenty20 format of the league for the first time.

Record 
{| class="wikitable"  style="text-align:center"
! rowspan="2" |Season
! colspan="2" |One-Day
! colspan="2" |Twenty20
|-
!Teams
!Position
!Teams
!Position
|-
|2011
|10
|style="background:gold;"|Winner
|10
|style="background:silver;"|Runners-up
|-
|2012
|9
|style="background:gold;"|Winner
|9
|style="background:gold;"|Winner
|-
|2013
| colspan="2" |Not held
|10
|style="background:silver;"|Runners-up
|-
|2014
|9
|style="background:silver;"|Runners-up
| colspan="2" rowspan="5" |Not held
|-
|2015
|10
|style="background:silver;"|Runners-up
|-
|2017
|8
|bgcolor=#deb678|Semi-Finals
|-
|2018
|10
|style="background:gold;"|Winner
|-
|2019
|10
|bgcolor=#deb678|Semi-Finals
|-
|2021
|10
|style="background:silver;"|'Runners-up
|TBD
|TBD
|}

 Squad 

 Football 

At its first appearance in the Martyr's Memorial A-Division League of season 2005–06, the club finished the season in fifth position, behind MMC, Three Star, Tribhuvan Army Club and the Nepal Police Club.

The club remained in fifth position in the 2006–07 season.

At the end of the 2009–10 season, the APF Club barely escaped relegation, staying in the league only by defeating Machchindra Club by 8–0 in the last match of the league. At the end of all 22 matches, APF is now in 10th position.

 Record by season 

 Current squad Last updated 28 October 2021''.

References

External links 
Match History of Armed Police Force Club Nepal
Armed Police Force Club website
The Recreational Sport Soccer Statistics Foundation
SoccerAge Nepal
Soccer in Nepal on BlogSpot
Match History of Armed Police Force Club Nepal

Football clubs in Nepal
2001 establishments in Nepal
Cricket teams in Nepal